Jean Grandjean (5 February 1752 – 12 November 1781) was a Dutch painter, draftsman, and watercolourist.

Grandjean was born in Amsterdam. He studied under Jurriaan Andriessen at the Stadstekenacademie (City Drawing School). He painted genre art, historical works, and landscapes. He traveled around studying and working in Germany and Italy. He died in Rome on 12 November 1781.

References

1752 births
1781 deaths
Dutch male painters
Dutch draughtsmen
18th-century Dutch painters
18th-century Dutch male artists
Painters from Amsterdam